During the 2001–02 German football season, 1. FC Kaiserslautern competed in the Bundesliga.

Season summary 
Kaiserslautern rose one place in the table to 7th, securing a return to European football through the Intertoto Cup.

Players

First-team squad 
Squad at end of season

Left club during season

Competitions

Bundesliga

League table

DFB-Pokal

References

Notes 

1. FC Kaiserslautern seasons
German football clubs 2001–02 season